Clubul Sportiv al Armatei Steaua București, commonly known as CSA Steaua București or simply Steaua, is a major multi-sports club based in Bucharest and run by the Ministry of National Defence. It is one of the most successful clubs in Romania and among the most successful multi-sport clubs in Europe. Founded on 7 June 1947 as Asociația Sportivă a Armatei București (Army Sports Association Bucharest), the club changed its name several times before settling on to Steaua in 1961.

The club is probably most known for its football team, also called CSA Steaua București. Other sections belonging to the club are rugby, ice hockey (autonomous – Hochei Club Steaua Suki București), handball, water polo, basketball, volleyball, athletics, swimming, gymnastics, boxing, rowing, canoeing, shooting, weightlifting, fencing, tennis, cycling, and judo.

History 

On 7 June 1947, at the initiative of several officers of the Romanian Army, the first Romanian sports club of the Army was born through a decree signed by General Mihail Lascăr, High Commander of the Romanian Royal Army. The club was to be called ASA București (Asociația Sportivă a Armatei București – English: Army Sports Association), with seven different sections (football, fencing, volleyball, boxing, shooting, athletics, and tennis), and its leadership was entrusted to General-Major Oreste Alexandrescu. The decision had been adopted on the ground that several officers were already competing for different clubs, premise to a good nucleus for forming future competitive teams. This was also the year of the club's first national title, achieved by Gheorghe Viziru in tennis.

As the Romanian Royal Army turned into the People's Army following the coup d'état at the end of 1947, which saw Romania transformed from a monarchy to a Communist inspired people's republic, several name changes carried on. On June 5, 1948, by Order 289 the Ministry of National Defence, ASA became CSCA (Clubul Sportiv Central al Armatei – English: Central Sports Club of the Army), together with the society's first crest (an A-labeled red star, symbol of the Red Army, on a blue disc). In March 1950, CSCA changed its name to CCA (Casa Centrală a Armatei, English: "Central House of the Army"). In 1961, CCA changed its names for the final time to CSA Steaua București (Clubul Sportiv al Armatei Steaua – English: Army Sports Club Steaua). The name Steaua is Romanian for The Star and was adopted because of the presence, just like in any other Eastern-European Army team, of a red star (turned yellow now, to symbolize Romania's tri-colour red, yellow and blue flag) on their badge.

9 April 1974 witnessed the inauguration of the country's most modern sports complex at that time, Complexul Sportiv Steaua (Steaua Sports Complex), comprising a central football-use arena (30,000 capacity Stadionul Ghencea), six other training pitches also used by the rugby team and mini-hotel for the athletes. Today, Complexul Sportiv Steaua has been leased on a 49-year period to the football club, planning for renovation.

Over the years, the club's most successful sections on an international scale have been those of handball (European champions twice), football (European champions once), volleyball, gymnastics, tennis, athletics, shooting, fencing, rowing, and canoeing. Former tennis star Ilie Năstase began his professional career at the club.

Sections

Football 

The football section was one of the seven sections formed at CSA Steaua's foundation, on 7 June 1947. The team's big breakthrough came in 1986, when they managed to become the first ever European champions from an Eastern country by winning the European Champions Cup. Ever since, they became the most successful football team in the country, with an impressive roll of 21 National Championships, 20 Romanian Cups, 4 Romanian Super Cups, 1 European Champions Cup and 1 European Supercup. Steaua has the large majority of Romanian football fans, over 60% of the population listing Steaua as their favourite team.

The club's football department was once thought to have separated from CSA Steaua in 1998. This information was, however, false, as Tica Danilescu, a former club employee, revealed in 2017. According to Danilescu, the nonprofit known as AFC Steaua București never bought the football department, as believed. It was just brought on as an administrator. It was allowed to use the Steaua brand and name, but it could not sell them. The team now known as Fotbal Club Fcsb pretended to be Steaua. However, it was not. And, after the Ministry of National Defense sued FC Fcsb in 2011, claiming that the Romanian Army were the rightful owners of the Steaua logo, colours, honours and name, the executive committee of the Romanian Football Federation approved an application to modify the name of the club from "SC Fotbal Club Steaua București SA", as it was previously known, to "SC Fotbal Club FCSB SA" on 30 March 2017, following more judiciary sentences and the decision to pay the CSA Steaua owners 38 million euros for the illegal use of their name.

CSA Steaua București had previously announced they would reactivate their football department in the summer of the same year. The team started training in July 2017, with Marius Lăcătuș as head coach. The team was introduced in the Liga IV.

Gymnastics 
The Gymnastics department at Steaua is very strong. They're one of the largest clubs in Romania and have created World and Olympic level gymnasts.
Gymnasts that they've created;

Sandra Izbașa – 2× Olympic Champion (London 2012, Vault and Floor)
Alexandra Eremia – 2× Olympian Medalist (Athens 2004, Gold and Bronze)
Silvia Stroescu – 1× Olympic Champion (Athens 2004, Team)
Marian Drăgulescu – 3× Olympian Medalist (Athens 2004, Silver and Bronze twice), including eight gold medals at the World Championships and ten gold medals in the European Championships.

Handball (Men) 

The handball team Steaua MFA București won the European Cup in 1967–68 (13–11 vs Dukla Praha) and 1976–77 (21–20 vs CSKA Moskva) as well as the European Challenge Cup in 2005–06 (21–26 and 34–27 vs SC Horta). They were also runners-up two times in the European Cup in 1970–71 (16–17 vs VfL Gummersbach) and 1988–89 (30–24 and 23–37 vs SKA Minsk).

The team has also won the Romanian Handball Championship (in seven players) 27 times (1962–63, 1966–67, 1967–68, 1968–69, 1969–70, 1970–71, 1971–72, 1972–73, 1973–74, 1974–75, 1975–76, 1976–77, 1978–79, 1979–80, 1980–81, 1981–82, 1982–83, 1983–84, 1984–85, 1986–87, 1987–88, 1988–89, 1989–90, 1993–94, 1995–96, 1999–00, 2000–01), the Romanian Handball Championship (in eleven players) 7 times (1950, 1951, 1952, 1954, 1955, 1957, 1961) and the Romanian Cup 7 times (1980–81, 1984–85, 1989–90, 1996–97, 1999–00, 2000–01, 2006–07).

They play their home matches at Chiajna Sports Hall. The current head coach is Sandu Iacob. The handball and ice-hockey teams are the fans' second favourite teams after the football one, and derby matches against HCM Constanța and especially Dinamo are highly attended.

Former players include such big names in the history of handball, as Ștefan Birtalan, Gheorghe Gruia, Cristian Gațu, Radu Voina, Vasile Stângă, Marian Dumitru and Alexandru Dedu.

Ice hockey 

Steaua București Hockey founded an Ice Hockey section in 1951. Hochei Club Steaua Suki București has been an autonomous club since 2004, but still belongs to CSA Steaua. It is the most successful club in Romania, having won the domestic league 40 times, a standing world record for ice hockey national championships. They compete inside a national competition of only 6 teams and in which, besides them, only SC Miercurea Ciuc are especially relevant. Steaua plays SC Miercurea Ciuc in the final every year over a "best of 7" encounter. The derby match between Steaua and SC Miercurea Ciuc is the biggest ice hockey match in the country and one of an immense rivalry, as Steaua fans are mainly of Romanian nationality while Miercurea Ciuc's are mainly Hungarian.

The ice-hockey team, along with the handball one, are the fans' second favourite teams after the football one. They play their home matches at the Mihail Flamaropol Ice Rink. The current coach is Cam Severson.

Rugby Union 

The Steaua București rugby team has won the domestic league 24 times since 1947. Romanian rugby club teams do not participate in major European competitions because of the obvious value difference between them and the ones from the leading continental countries. Instead, a Romania national rugby union team, consisting mainly of Steaua players, participates every year in the European Challenge Cup as București Rugby.

The team plays its home matches at Ghencea II Field, inside the Steaua Sports Complex, right next to the football Ghencea Stadium. The current coach is Costică Florea.

Basketball (Men) 

CSA Steaua founded the basketball team in 1952. The club won the Romanian Basketball Championship 21 times in 1955–56, 1957–58, 1958–59, 1959–60, 1960–61, 1961–62, 1962–63, 1963–64, 1965–66, 1969–70, 1977–78, 1979–80, 1980–81, 1981–82, 1983–84, 1984–85, 1985–86, 1986–87, 1988–89, 1989–90 and 1990–91. The team's most notable achievement is a semifinal run at the 1960–61 FIBA European Champions Cup.

After the Romanian Revolution, Baschet Club Steaua București was the first basketball club in Romania to turn private. However, after only few years it went bankrupt, and CSA Steaua operated only a youth club for basketball, under the name of Clubul Sportiv Școlar Steaua București. However, this summer, BC Steaua București merged with BC Târgoviște and will play again in the first division, under the name BC Steaua Turabo București.

Volleyball (Men) 

Steaua were European Cup runners-up twice in 1969 (against CSKA Sofia) and 1979 (against Cervena Hvezda Bratislava) and Cup Winners' Cup runners-up three times in 1977 (against Elektrotechnika Riga), 1981 (against Cervena Hvezda Bratislava) and 1986 (against Panini Modena). They were Divizia A1 champions in 1951, 1952, 1954, 1957, 1967, 1968, 1969, 1960, 1971, 1978, 1986, 1987, 1988, 1989, 1990 and 1991.

Water polo 

Even though the Romanian national team has had some outstanding performances lately, club water polo has only a minor word to say in international competitions. Steaua are one of the leading teams inside a national league with only four professional clubs, the rest being amateur. The team's official name is CSA Steaua Stirom București named after their sponsors.

Club records 
Source.

References

Further reading 
 Mihai Ionescu, Ion Cupen, Constelația valorilor sportive, Editura Militară, 1972.
 Marin Ciuperceanu, Steliştii, Editura Militară, 1984.
 Cristian Țopescu, Octavian Vintilă, Steaua performanţă şi prestigiu, Editura Militară, 1988.
 CSA Steaua, Clubul Sportiv al Armatei 1947–2017 istoria continuă, CSA Steaua București, 2017.

External links 

Official websites
CSASteaua.ro 
SteauaRugby.com 
Online Shop
Steaua TV

Fan websites
Steaua Liberă 
AS47.ro 

 
Multi-sport clubs in Romania
Sports clubs in Bucharest
Sports clubs established in 1947
1947 establishments in Romania
Military sports clubs